Lewinsville is an unincorporated community in Fairfax County, Virginia, United States. Traditionally, the center of Lewinsville has been located at the crossroads of Lewinsville and Chain Bridge Roads. Together with Langley, Lewinsville forms the census-designated place of McLean.

During the Civil War, on Wednesday, September 11, 1861, the Battle of Lewinsville was fought here between the Union Army and the Confederate Army. Casualties for the Union were three dead and some wounded, while casualties for the Confederates were none.

References

Unincorporated communities in Fairfax County, Virginia
Unincorporated communities in Virginia
Washington metropolitan area